Blaise X. Bryant (born November 23, 1969) is a former running back in the Canadian Football League who played with the Winnipeg Blue Bombers.

He played college for the Iowa State Cyclones and is one of the college's all-time leading rushers.

Today Blaise Bryant is a married and a parent living in Orange County, CA. He works as a successful mortgage and real estate broker.

Career regular season rushing statistics

References

Living people
1969 births
Players of American football from California
Sportspeople from Huntington Beach, California
American players of Canadian football
Winnipeg Blue Bombers players
Iowa State Cyclones football players